Walter Santesso (27 February 1931 in Padua, Italy – 20 January 2008) was an Italian film actor and director. His character name "Paparazzo" in Federico Fellini's 1960 film La Dolce Vita has become synonymous with modern celebrity/tabloid photographers, who are collectively referred to as paparazzi.

Filmography

References

External links

1931 births
2008 deaths
Italian male film actors
Italian film directors
Actors from Padua
Film people from Padua